Arthur Wheelock Moulton (May 3, 1873 – August 18, 1962) was an American Episcopal bishop, born at Worcester, Massachusetts. He graduated from Hobart College, where he was a member of the Sigma Chi fraternity, then attended the Episcopal General Theological Seminary, and the Episcopal Theological School.  He was ordained a priest in the Protestant Episcopal Church in 1901.  From 1900 to 1918, he was curate and rector of Grace Church, Lawrence, Massachusetts.  He was awarded an honorary A.M. degree by Hobart College in 1909
He served in World War I as a chaplain in the field artillery and at a base hospital in France.  On April 29, 1920, he was consecrated bishop of Utah, where he served until his retirement in 1946. He wrote Memoir of Augustine H. Amory (1909) and It Comes to Pass (1916). He died in Salt Lake City, Utah in 1962.

Work for world peace
In retirement from 1946 on Moulton campaigned for world peace.  He lent his name to communist groups, but in 1951, he turned down the $25,000 Stalin Peace Prize by reportedly saying that "The only reward I want in working for peace is peace".

References

United States Army personnel of World War I
American memoirists
Hobart and William Smith Colleges alumni
Writers from Worcester, Massachusetts
1873 births
1962 deaths
Clergy from Salt Lake City
Stalin Peace Prize recipients
World War I chaplains
United States Army chaplains
American biographers
Episcopal bishops of Utah